The Chairman of the European Union Military Committee (CEUMC) is the four-star rank officer representing and presiding over the European Union's (EU) Military Committee (EUMC), composed of the chiefs of defence (CHODs) of the EU member states. The chairman is selected by the chiefs of defence of the member states and appointed by the members of the Council of the European Union for a three-year term.

Task
The chairman has the following tasks:
Acting as the spokesperson for the EUMC
Participating in Political and Security Committee meetings as appropriate
Acting as the military adviser to the High Representative of the Union for Foreign Affairs and Security Policy (HR) who heads the EEAS European External Action Service
Representing the primary point of contact with the Operation Commanders of the EU's military operations
Attending Council meetings with defence and security implications

Role in command and control of missions

List of holders

See also

High Representative of the Union for Foreign Affairs and Security Policy
Director General of the European Union Military Staff
Chairman of the NATO Military Committee
Supreme Allied Commander Europe

References

External links